The Black Tower is a 1981 fantasy role-playing game supplement published by Midkemia Press.

Contents
The Black Tower is an adventure in which raiders took over the castle a hundred years ago with the aid of sorcery but were themselves done in by the defenders' magic, and now monsters and a horribly altered wizard from that battle still haunt the castle.

Reception
Anders Swenson reviewed The Black Tower for Different Worlds magazine and stated that "The Black Tower is a full-sized 44 page book with a four-page dungeon map. The price is right and the adventure is a good buy."

Ronald Pehr reviewed The Black Tower in The Space Gamer No. 46. Pehr commented that "The Black Tower'''s drawbacks are certainly no more flagrant than those found in other game aids, and it is as much fun as similar adventure scenarios published by other companies. If you play D&D, and like 'dungeon-runs' with the accent on high-powered combat, you'll enjoy The Black Tower''."

References

Fantasy role-playing game supplements
Midkemia Press
Role-playing game supplements introduced in 1981